First Congregational Church of Otto, now known as the Medora Ball Historical Museum, is a historic Congregational church building located at Otto in Cattaraugus County, New York. It was built in 1861 and is in a vernacular Italianate style. The building served as a hub of religious and social life in this rural community. An original steeple was removed in 1917 after being severely damaged by a tornado. The church underwent a major remodeling in 1925. The last regular church service was held in 1946. In 1969, the building was deeded to the Cattaraugus Area Historical Society. It was renamed in 1994 the Medora Ball Historical Museum, after the Otto town historian.

It was listed on the National Register of Historic Places in 1999.

References

External links
Historical marker/historic landmark for First Congregational Church of Otto in Otto, NY
Waymarking.com Medora Ball Historical Museum
Medora Ball Museum - local tourism information

Churches on the National Register of Historic Places in New York (state)
Churches completed in 1861
Museums in Cattaraugus County, New York
History museums in New York (state)
1861 establishments in New York (state)
National Register of Historic Places in Cattaraugus County, New York